Knighton railway station serves the market town of Knighton in Powys, Wales, although the station itself is located in Shropshire, England (the border is immediately adjacent to the south side of the station and runs through the car park).

All trains serving the station are operated by Transport for Wales, who also manage the station.

History

The station was built in 1865, although the Knighton Railway route from Craven Arms had reached here four years previously. The present station dates from the opening of the Central Wales Railway to Llandrindod Wells.

In 2004 the station was partially refurbished, with visual display units installed to display train departure times, and enhanced disabled access on the northbound platform. The station building still stands, but is not used for railway purposes. Tickets must be bought on the train (as the station is unstaffed), whilst there are waiting shelters provided on each side and a customer help point situated on platform 1.

There are two platforms at the station today, although from 1964 until 1990 only a single line and platform (the current southbound one) was used. The northbound loop (and platform) was out of action for more than two years but was put back into use by Network Rail in September 2010 following the replacement of the old automatic points (which were obsolete) with new electrically worked ones.

Proposed Knighton to Presteigne railway
The plans for a proposed Knighton to Presteigne Railway were deposited on 30 November 1865.

Services
 
There are five trains a day to Swansea from Monday to Saturday, plus two more as far as Llandrindod on weekdays only. Two services each way call on Sundays.

References

Further reading

External links
Video and narration. Knighton or Trefyclawdd railway station

Railway stations in Shropshire
DfT Category F1 stations
Former London and North Western Railway stations
Railway stations in Great Britain opened in 1861
Heart of Wales Line
Railway stations served by Transport for Wales Rail
1861 establishments in Wales